Thando is a unisex given name, common in southern Africa, which means "love". It may refer to:

Thando Nomhle McLaren (born 1977), pen name Na'ima B. Robert, South African/British author
Thando Bula (born 1981), South African cricketer
Thando Mgqolozana (born 1983), South African writer
Thando Mngomeni (born 1983), South African football (soccer) player
Thando Ntini (born 2000), South African cricketer
Thando Thabethe (born 1990), South African actress
Thando Sikwila (born 1993), Zimbabwean/Australian singer
Thando Dube  (born 2000), South African/Zimbabwean teen and amateur editor 

African given names